Jack Campbell Pullar (born 15 November 1989) is a British former racing cyclist, who rode professionally between 2013 and 2018 for , , , Velosure-Starley Racing, Wheelbase and Vanilla Bikes. Pullar has worked with coach and teammate James Gullen.

Pullar won the British National Hill Climb Championships in 2012.

Pullar was part of the Scottish national team during the 2014 Commonwealth Games where he competed in the Men’s Road Race alongside David Millar, Evan Oliphant and Andrew Fenn, although he failed to finish in a race of attrition with only twelve finishers.

Major results

2012
 1st National Hill Climb Championships
2013
 4th Stockton Town Centre Race
 8th Ryedale Grand Prix
 9th Colne Grand Prix
2014
 6th Cycle Wiltshire Grand Prix
 8th Lincoln Grand Prix
2016
 2nd Jim Rogers Memorial Road Race
 2nd Ryedale Grand Prix
 3rd Eddie Soens Memorial

References

External links

1989 births
Scottish male cyclists
Living people
Cyclists at the 2014 Commonwealth Games
Place of birth missing (living people)
Commonwealth Games competitors for Scotland